This is a list of known governors of the Roman province of Cappadocia. It was created in AD 17 as an imperial consular province by the Emperor Tiberius, following the death of king Archelaus. The Pontic and Armenian territories were split off by Diocletian during his reorganization of the empire during the 290s, and the province was reduced to the region of Cappadocia proper. In the late 330s, the eastern half of the province was split off to form the provinces of Armenia Prima and Armenia Secunda. In 371, emperor Valens split off the south-western region around Tyana, which became Cappadocia Secunda under a praeses, while the remainder became Cappadocia Prima under a consularis. In the period 535-553, under emperor Justinian I, Cappadocia Prima and Secunda were reunited under a proconsul, and eventually this province became the themata of Anatolikon and Armeniakon sometime during the seventh century. Many of the dates listed are approximate dates the office was held.

Julio-Claudian dynasty 
 Quintus Veranius—c. AD 18
 Iulius Paelignus—51-52
 Gnaeus Domitius Corbulo—55-61
 Lucius Caesennius Paetus—61-62
 Gnaeus Domitius Corbulo—63/64-65/66

Flavian dynasty 
 ? Marcus Ulpius Trajanus—70/71-72/73
 Gnaeus Pompeius Collega—73/74-76/77
 Marcus Hirrius Fronto Neratius Pansa—77/78-79/80
 Aulus Caesennius Gallus—80/81-82/83
 ? Publius Valerius Patruinus—83/84-85/86
 Tiberius Julius Candidus Marius Celsus—89/90-91/92
 Lucius Antistius Rusticus—92/93-93/94
 Lucius Caesennius Sospes—93/94
 Titus Pomponius Bassus—94/95-99/100
 Quintus Orfitasius Aufidius Umber—100/101-103/104
 Publius Calvisius Ruso Julius Frontinus—104/105-106/107
 Gaius Julius Quadratus Bassus—107/108-110/111

After creation of the province of Galatia 
 Marcus Junius Homullus—111/112-113/114
 Lucius Catilius Severus Julianus Claudius Reginus—114/5-116/117
 Gaius Bruttius Praesens Lucius Fulvius Rusticus—121/122-123/124
 (? Lucius) Statorius Secundus—124/125-126/127
 Titus Prifernius Geminus—127/128-129/130
 Lucius Flavius Arrianus—130/131-136/137
 Lucius Burbuleius Optatus Ligarianus—between 137 and 141
 Publius Cassius Secundus—c. 141-c. 144
 Lucius Aemilius Carus—c. 148-c. 151
 Marcus Cassius Apollinaris—c. 151-c. 154
 Marcus Sedatius Severianus—c. 157-161/162
 Marcus Statius Priscus Licinius Italicus—162-c. 163
 Lucius Julius Statilius Severus—c. 163-c. 166
 Publius Martius Verus—166-175
 Gaius Arrius Antoninus—175-c. 177
 Caelius Calvinus—c. 184
 Gaius Julius Flaccus Aelianus—c. 198
 L. M[...]ius—c. 199
 Claudius Hieronymianus—c. 212
 Quintus Atrius Clonius—between 211 and 222
 Gaius Catius Clemens—217-218
 Marcus Munatius Sulla Cerialis—218
 Marcus Ulpius Ofellus Theodorus—219-221
 Aurelius Basileus—221-222
 Asinius Lepidus—222/223—224/225
 (? P.) Aradius Paternus—c. 231
 Quintus Julius Proculeianus—c. 231, successor of Paternus
 Licinnius Serenianus—c. 235
 Sextus Catius Clementinus Priscillianus—236/237—237/238
 T.(?) Cuspidius Flaminius Severus—238/239—239/240
 Titus Clodius Saturninus Fidus—240/241—242/243
 Marcus Antonius Memmius Hiero—243/244—245/246
 Publius Petronius Polianus—246/247—248/249
 Aulus Vergilius Maximus—251—253

References 

Cappadocia